Maria Bengtsson may refer to:

 Maria Bengtsson (badminton) (born 1964), Swedish badminton player
 Maria Bengtsson (soprano) (born 1975), Swedish operatic soprano